Raud-Ants is an Estonian folk metal band from Viljandi that was formed in 2002. Raud-Ants combines Estonian folk music with Heavy metal. The band was raised in Tartu and Tallinn.

In 2006 the group participated in the annual minority language music festival Liet-Lavlut with the song "Kui miä kazvolin kanainõ", which was performed in the almost extinct language Votic.

Members
Eva Tolsa – vocals
Marion Selgall – vocals
Tarvi Martens – kantele
Madis Arukask – guitar
Marju Varblane – jouhikko, violin
Arno Looga – bass
Andres Linnupuu – drums

Discography
Albums
2005: Karjasepõli

Demos
2002:  Antsu Loomine

External links
Official site
Profile at Estonian Metal

Estonian folk metal musical groups
Votia
Musical groups established in 2002
2002 establishments in Estonia